Annai  Vailankanni College of Engineering (AVCE) is a private co-educational Engineering College in the Indian state, AVK Nagar, Pothayadi Salai, Pottalkulam, Azhagappapuram Post, Kanyakumari District, Tamil Nadu. It was established in 2008. The college is accredited by AICTE and affiliated to Anna University.

References

External links
  College website

Engineering colleges in Tamil Nadu
Colleges affiliated to Anna University
Universities and colleges in Kanyakumari district
Educational institutions established in 2008
2008 establishments in Tamil Nadu